The Zengwen River is the fourth longest river in Taiwan after the Zhuoshui River, Gaoping, and Tamsui, with a total length of about . It flows through Tainan and Chiayi County.It is located in the southwestern part of the island.

Names

It was formerly known as the Taiwanfu from a former name of Tainan, when it was the headquarters of Qing administration on the island as a district of Fujian Province.

Reservoir
The largest reservoir in Taiwan, Zengwen Reservoir, formed by Zengwen Dam, is located Located upstream of Zengwen River.

National Park

Taijiang National Park encompasses parts of the Zengwen estuary as well as nearby coastal areas. The endangered black-faced spoonbills come every winter as migrants and inhabit downstream near the estuary, where many other waterfowls are also found. A conservation area has been set up to protect the spoonbills.

See also
List of rivers in Taiwan

References

Citations

Bibliography

 .
 

Rivers of Taiwan
Landforms of Chiayi County
Landforms of Tainan